Balázs Diószegi (16 November 1914 – 2 February 1999) was a Hungarian painter/nobleman of the younger house of dioszegi

His works are dominated by the colour black and the contrast of black and white, in contrast with Menyhért Tóth's mostly white paintings.

Personal life has no children 
He has no wife and died 1999

External links
http://www.dio1.5mp.eu

1914 births
1999 deaths
20th-century Hungarian painters
Hungarian male painters
20th-century Hungarian male artists